The Cattle Cabin is a one-room log cabin that was built in the Sierra Nevada by Hale D. Tharp and two partners in 1890, in present-day Sequoia National Park, California.

Cattle Cabin is located in the Giant Forest of giant redwoods (Sequoiadendron giganteum), and is associated with Tharp's Log as a structure supporting ranching operations in the area. The cabin and the surrounding lands were bought by the National Park Service in 1916.

References

External links

National Park Service - "Challenge of the Big Trees", Caucasian Settlers come to the Southern Sierra, with history on Hale Tharp

National Register of Historic Places in Sequoia National Park
Houses on the National Register of Historic Places in California
Houses in Tulare County, California
Rustic architecture in California
Log cabins in the United States
1890 establishments in California
Log buildings and structures on the National Register of Historic Places in California